The 1894 Invercargill mayoral election was held on 28 November 1894 as part of that year's local elections.

Results
The following table gives the election results:

References

1894 elections in New Zealand
Mayoral elections in Invercargill